Drugovo (} is a village in the municipality of Kičevo, North Macedonia. It was the seat of the now-defunct Drugovo Municipality.

Demographics
In statistics gathered by Vasil Kanchov in 1900, the village of Drugovo was inhabited by 260 Muslim Albanians. The Yugoslav census of 1948 recorded 537 people of whom 478 were Albanians and 59 Macedonians. The Yugoslav census of 1953 recorded 610 people of whom 358 were Turks, 179 Albanians, 70 Macedonians and 3 others. The 1961 Yugoslav census recorded 606 people of whom 412 were Macedonians, 141 Turks, 46 Albanians and 7 others. The 1971 census recorded 944 people of whom 764 were Macedonians, 151 Turks, 19 Albanians and 13 others. The 1981 Yugoslav census recorded 1291 people of whom 1046 were Macedonians, 149 Turks, 55 Bosniaks, 32 Albanians and 9 others. The Macedonian census of 1994 recorded 1398 people of whom 1171 were Macedonians, 153 Turks, 61 Albanians and 13 others.

According to the 2002 census, the village had a total of 1,492 inhabitants. Ethnic groups in the village include:
Macedonians 1,250
Albanians 108
Turks 128
Romani 1
Serbs 2 
Others 3

As of the 2021 census, Drugovo had 1,545 residents with the following ethnic composition:
Macedonians 1,276
Turks 122
Albanians 81
Persons for whom data are taken from administrative sources 60
Others 6

References

External links

Villages in Kičevo Municipality
Albanian communities in North Macedonia